Chad Morgan (born September 21, 1973) is an American actress best known for her voice-over work on Adult Swim's Robot Chicken series, where she performs the voices of celebrities.

In addition to appearing in a 2008 episode of the hit Fox series House, M.D., Morgan has appeared on television series including The Guardian, Cold Case, Family Guy, Stargate Atlantis, and all three shows in the CSI franchise. She had a recurring role on the series The District throughout its four-year run, and has appeared in feature films, most notably playing a small role in the 2001 blockbuster Pearl Harbor.

Celebrities voiced
Celebrities Chad Morgan has voiced and/or impersonated include:

 Gillian Anderson (as Agent Dana Scully from The X-Files)
 Laura Bush
 Hillary Clinton
 Katie Couric
 Cameron Diaz
 Florence Henderson (as Carol Brady from The Brady Bunch)
 Daryl Hannah (as Elle Driver from Kill Bill)
 Hilary Duff
 Estelle Getty (as Sophia Petrillo from The Golden Girls)
 Teri Hatcher
 Paris Hilton
 Kristin Holt
 Maureen McCormick (as Marcia Brady from The Brady Bunch)
 Ashley Olsen
 Betsy Ross
 J. K. Rowling
 Ashlee Simpson
 Tiffani Thiessen (as Kelly Kapowski from Saved by the Bell)
 Christina Aguilera
 Jamie Lynn Spears

Filmography

Features
 Pearl Harbor (2001) .... Pearl Harbor Nurse
 The Purge: Anarchy (2014)
 The Grace of Jake (2015)

Television
 Weird Science (1 episode, "Teen Lisa", 1995) .... Heather
 Co-ed Call Girl (1996) (TV) .... Tracy
 The War at Home (1996) .... Bus Station Clerk
 Chicago Hope (1 episode, "The Lung and the Restless", 1997) .... Nina Burke
 Whatever (1998) .... Brenda Talbot
 Brimstone (1 episode, "Heat", 1998) .... Gwendolyn DeBare
 Kilroy (1999) (TV) .... Jane
 Boy Meets World (1 episode, "The Truth About Honesty", 1999) .... Dana
 Promised Land (1 episode, "Baby Steps", 1999) .... Vicki
 Wasteland (1 episode, "My Ex-friends Wedding", 1999) .... Gwen
 Picnic (2000) (TV) .... Millie Owens
 Diagnosis: Murder (1 episode, "Being of Sound Mind", 2001) .... Ingrid Thurston
 Taken (3 episodes, "High Hopes", "Maintenance" and "Charlie and Lisa", 2002) .... Becky Clarke - Adult
 CSI: Crime Scene Investigation (1 episode, "One Hit Wonder", 2003) .... Joanne Crooks
 The District (7 episodes, "The Santa Wars", "A Southern Town", "Cop Hunt", "This Too Shall Pass", "Daughter for Daughter", "Party Favors" and "Something Borrowed, Something Bruised", 2000–2004) .... Beth Mannion
 The Guardian (3 episodes, "Sparkle", "Remember" and "Antarctica", 2004) .... Emily Bernsley
 Helter Skelter (2004) (TV) .... Suzanne LaBianca
 Cold Case (1 episode, "Factory Girls", 2004) .... Alice Miller 1943
 Robot Chicken (22 episodes, 2005–2008) .... Various (voice)
 Stargate Atlantis (1 episode, "Epiphany", 2005) .... Teer
 Wanted (2 episodes, "Badlands" and "Judas", 2005) .... Dana Fontana
 Family Guy (1 episode, "You May Now Kiss the... Uh... Guy Who Receives", 2006) .... Alyssa (voice)
 CSI: Miami (1 episode, "Going Under", 2006) .... Suzanne McCarthy
 CSI: NY (1 episode, "Obsession", 2007) .... Liz Grayson
 Robot Chicken: Star Wars (2007) (TV) .... Various (voice)
 House, M.D. (1 episode, "No More Mr. Nice Guy", 2008) .... Deb
 Wilfred (1 episode, "Isolation") .... Maggie
 Ghost Whisperer (1 episode, "Leap of Faith") .... Clarissa Webb

References

External links
 

1973 births
Living people
Actresses from Atlanta
American voice actresses
21st-century American women